Bobby Fernando (born 25 May 1975) is a Sri Lankan cricketer. He made his first-class debut in the 1994/95 season, and played for Tamil Union Cricket and Athletic Club in the 2018–19 Premier League Tournament in December 2018.

References

External links
 

1975 births
Living people
Sri Lankan cricketers
Moratuwa Sports Club cricketers
Tamil Union Cricket and Athletic Club cricketers
Place of birth missing (living people)